Liu Junchen (born May 1963) is a Chinese politician who is the current executive deputy secretary-general of the National People's Congress, in office since July 2022.

He was a representative of the 19th National Congress of the Chinese Communist Party. He is a representative of the 20th National Congress of the Chinese Communist Party and a member of the 20th Central Committee of the Chinese Communist Party.

Biography
Liu was born in Shangcai County, Henan, in May 1963. After resuming the college entrance examination in 1979, he attended Zhengzhou University where he received his bachelor's degree in law in 1983. He went on to receive his master's degree in law from Jilin University in 1986 and obtained his doctor's degree in law from Renmin University of China in 2002. He joined the Chinese Communist Party (CCP) in May 1985, nearing graduation.

After university in 1986, Liu was despatched to the State Administration for Industry and Commerce, where he assumed various posts.

In November 2010, Liu was transferred to north China's Inner Mongolia and appointed governor and deputy party secretary of Xilingol League.

In May 2013, Liu was recalled to the State Administration for Industry and Commerce and appointed deputy director.

In March 2018, Liu became a member of the State Administration for Market Regulation, concurrently serving as party branch secretary and deputy director of the State Intellectual Property Office.

Liu was chosen as vice chairperson of the National People's Congress Legislative Affairs Committee in October 2018, and was made deputy secretary-general of the National People's Congress two years later.

References

1963 births
Living people
People from Shangcai County
Zhengzhou University alumni
Jilin University alumni
Renmin University of China alumni
People's Republic of China politicians from Henan
Chinese Communist Party politicians from Henan
Members of the 20th Central Committee of the Chinese Communist Party